Gilbert Moses III (August 20, 1942 – April 15, 1995) was an American director. He was also known for his work in the Civil Rights movement, as a staff member of the Student Non-Violent Coordinating Committee (SNCC) and founder of the touring company, the Free Southern Theater toured the South during the 1960s.

Early life
Moses was born in Cleveland, Ohio, and began acting as a child at Karamu House. He studied at Oberlin College and spent a year at the Sorbonne University in Paris, before leaving college to join the civil rights movement.

Career
Moses was the co-founder of the Free Southern Theater company, an important pioneer of African-American theatre.

His 1971 Broadway debut, Ain't Supposed to Die a Natural Death, won him a Tony Award nomination and the Drama Desk Award for Most Promising Director.

In 1976, he and George Faison teamed to co-direct and choreograph the ill-fated Alan Jay Lerner-Leonard Bernstein musical 1600 Pennsylvania Avenue, which closed after seven performances.

Moses' off-Broadway work as a director won him an Obie Award for Amiri Baraka's Slave Ship (1969) and the New York Drama Critics' Circle Award for The Taking of Miss Janie (1975). In 1986, his friendship with writer Toni Morrison led to his directing the world premiere of her first play Dreaming Emmett at Capital Repertory Theatre in Albany, NY. It remains the only production of the play.

Among Moses' television credits are Benson, Ghostwriter, The Paper Chase, Law & Order, several episodes of the mini-series Roots, and a number of television movies. His only feature films were Willie Dynamite (1974) and The Fish That Saved Pittsburgh (1979).

Personal life
Moses was married three times, to actress Denise Nicholas, Wilma Butler, and singer Dee Dee Bridgewater, and had two daughters, Tsia and China.

Death 
Moses died of multiple myeloma on April 15, 1995 in New York City. He was 52 years old.

References

External links
 
 
 
Warren, Robert Penn. Interview with Gilbert Moses and John O'Neal, c.1964 in Who Speaks for the Negro? Digital Archive of the Robert Penn Warren Center for the Humanities and the Jean and Alexander Heard Libraries at Vanderbilt University based on collections at University of Kentucky and Yale University Libraries.

1942 births
1995 deaths
African-American film directors
African-American television directors
American film directors
American television directors
American theatre directors
Deaths from cancer in New York (state)
Deaths from multiple myeloma
Artists from Cleveland
20th-century African-American people